Grigoriy Korchmar (Russian Григорий Корчмар, Grigorij Korčmar; alternately translated Grigori or Grigory) (born 1947 in Baltiysk) is a Russian composer and pianist.

Although little-known outside his native Russia, Korchmar is a prominent figure in the musical life of St Petersburg. He began to study piano and composition in 1958 at the Nikolai Rimsky-Korsakov Conservatory in St Petersburg. In 1996 he was made an "Honoured Art Worker of Russia".

Notable works by Korchmar include the operas Newlyweds (1970), A Story about Boris and Gleb (1981) and Fedra (1984), Dialogues for cello and piano (1976), Tango macabre for violin and piano (1985), White Nights Serenades (1991) for solo guitar and four symphonies, the latest of which was completed in 2003.

Grigoriy Korchmar's brother, Leonid Korchmar is a conductor of the Mariinsky Theatre and a notable conducting pedagogue.

References
  Official Site of "Grigoriy Korchmar" | Saint-Petersburg Contemporary Music Resource Center
 Compozitor biography

1947 births
20th-century classical composers
People from Baltiysk
21st-century classical composers
Living people
Russian classical composers
Russian male classical composers
Russian classical pianists
Male classical pianists
21st-century classical pianists
20th-century Russian male musicians
21st-century Russian male musicians